Malaun is a pejorative term for Bengali Hindus, most commonly used in Bangladesh. The word is derived from the Arabic "ملعون", meaning "accursed" or "deprived of God's Mercy", and in modern times, it is used as an ethnic slur by the Muslims in Bengal region for Hindus.

Etymology 

The Arabic word "ملعون" (mal'un), literally meaning 'cursed' is derived from the root "لعنة" (la'nat) meaning "curse". In Islamic parlance, it means 'deprived of Allah's mercy'. The word has been loaned into languages of non-Arabic Islamic countries like Malay and Indonesian. The dictionary published by the Bangla Academy gives the meaning of the Bengali word "মালাউন" as someone cursed or deprived of Allah's mercy or forcefully evicted or a Kafir. It mentions that the word is used as a slur by the Muslims against the non-Muslims. In Bangladesh, the word is more specifically used to refer to the Hindu religious minority. In colloquial usage, the word is sometimes shortened to Malu.

Usage 
Nirmal Kumar Bose noted the usage of the term as early as 1946 in Noakhali. During the 1971 Bangladesh Genocide, the Pakistani officers addressed Dr. Govinda Chandra Dev as malaun before executing him. According to eyewitness, AKM Yusuf had addressed a gathering of Peace Committee at Rampal in Khulna district on 19 April. At the gathering he addressed the Hindus as malauns and the Hindu women as spoils of war and exhorted the audience to kill them and loot their women. Hussain Muhammad Ershad, while serving as the President, had referred to the Hindus as malaun at a rally in Chhatak. He apologized for his remark after protests from the Hindus.

In December 2013, Ganajagaran Mancha presented a deputation to the Home Ministry complaining about police torture. The deputation alleged that on 19 December 2013 the police abused a Hindu woman activist as malaun because she had put sindur. In December 2014, Nasiruddin Pintu, a convicted BNP politician, abused a Bengali Hindu police officer by calling him a malaun when he attempted to stop his lawyers and supporters from meeting Pintu illegally. Pintu threatened the officer with loss of job and called him son of a pig. In January 2015, Awami League workers Shahnawaz abused fellow Awami League worker Sushanta Dasgupta at a party function in London.

In the Internet, a Jamaat-e-Islami run handle named Basher Kella has given the call for killing all the malauns and turning Bangladesh into a country where only the Muslims will live.

See also 
 Other pejorative terms for Hindus
 Kafir
 Keling

 Persecution of Hindus and Buddhists in Bangladesh
 1962 Rajshahi massacres
 1964 East-Pakistan riots
 1971 Bangladesh genocide
 Operation Searchlight
 Chuknagar massacre
 Jathibhanga massacre
 Shankharipara massacre
 Razakar 
 1989 Bangladesh pogroms
 1990 Bangladesh anti-Hindu violence
 1992 Bangladesh violence
 2012 Chirirbandar violence
 2012 Fatehpur violence
 2012 Hathazari violence
 2012 Ramu violence
 2013 Bangladesh Anti-Hindu violence
 2014 Bangladesh anti-Hindu violence
 2016 Nasirnagar Violence
 Noakhali riots 
 Persecution of indigenous peoples in Bangladesh
 Persecution of Hindus in Bangladesh
 Persecution of Buddhists in Bangladesh
 Persecution of Chakma buddhists

 Persecution of other non-Muslims in Bangladesh
 Persecution of Ahmadis in Bangladesh
 Persecution of Christians in Bangladesh
 Persecution of atheists and secularists in Bangladesh
 Freedom of religion in Bangladesh

References 

Ethnic and religious slurs
Anti–South Asian slurs
Anti-Hindu sentiment
Persecution of Bengali Hindus
Hate speech
Curses
Islamism in Bangladesh
Racism in Bangladesh